Sādhanā is a Sanskrit term for "a means to accomplish something" used in Hindu and Buddhist traditions.

Sadhana may also refer to:

People
 Sadhana Shivdasani, an Indian Bollywood actress (known mononymously as Sadhana)
 Sadhana (Malayalam actress), an Indian actress in Malayalam films during the 1960s and 1970s
 Sadhana Sargam, an Indian playback singer
 Bhagat Sadhana, North Indian Muslim poet, saint, mystic and one of the devotees whose hymn is present in Guru Granth Sahib

Media and literature
 Sadhna (film), a 1958 Hindi film directed by B. R. Chopra, starring Vyjayanthimala and Sunil Dutt
 Sadhana, a magazine edited between 1891 and 1895 by Bengali writer Rabindranath Tagore
 Sadhana: The Realization of Life, a collection of essays published in 1913 by Bengali writer Rabindranath Tagore
 Sadhana (weekly), a weekly Marathi-language publication established in 1948

Other usages

 Sadhana, practice of classical music
 Sādhanā (journal), a peer-reviewed journal of engineering and applied science published by the Indian Academy of Sciences